The 12th Asian Film Awards are the 2018 edition of the Asian Film Awards. The ceremony was held on March 17, 2018, at the Venetian Hotel in Macau.

Winners and nominees
Winners are listed first and highlighted in bold.

References

External links

Asian Film Awards ceremonies
2018 film awards
Film
2018 in Macau
March 2018 events in China
2018 in Chinese cinema